The Battle of Nisibis was fought between Byzantine forces under Belisarius and Peter and the Sassanian garrison of the frontier fortress of Nisibis that was under Nabedes. It took place while the Sassanian king Khosrow I was invading the Roman base in Lazica. It was part of a Byzantine offensive led by Belisarius into Persian land. Upon arriving in the area, Belisarius stationed his troops a significant distance away from the fortified city. He hoped to drag the Sasanian garrison into a battle far from the city walls, and after defeating them, capture the undefended city, which seemed impregnable otherwise. The Byzantine commander Peter stationed his forces, together with those of John Troglita who was associated with him, closer to the city. Belisarius warned Peter that since the Byzantines did not normally eat until midday the garrison would sally out then so the Byzantines would have to fight while hungry. Peter ignored this and at midday, his man dispersed to eat. When the Sassanians sallied out his disorganized unit was routed losing 50 men and Peter's standard. He immediately called on Belisarius for help. When the message reached Belisarius he had already seen the dust clouds produced by the Sassanian sally and was well on his way. Despite the garrison being overwhelmed by the larger Byzantine army, they suffered only 150 casualties as they quickly retreated to the city, exactly what Belisarius had sought to avoid.

Aftermath 

Recognising Nobades would not leave the city again out of fear for another such engagement Belisarius could now bypass the city as its garrison would not attack him in the rear. After an assault of Sisauranon failed he sent troops to raid rich normally safe Persian territory across the Tigris. After procuring much wealth from the area the Byzantine raiding forces split up and went home as some were afraid Belisarius would take their loot. Belisarius wanted to return home too as to avoid being surprised by the arrival of Persian forces under Khosrow. Procopius later claimed this because of Belisarius wanting to confront his wife Antonina, whose lover his troops had imprisoned, as soon as possible about her affair. Claiming that Belisarius could have reached Ctesiphon as the path remained undefended. This argument is flawed however as the same information of the disposition of Persian troops had not been available to Belisarius at that time.

References

Nisibis 541
Nisibis 541
541
Nisibis
540s in the Byzantine Empire
Nisibis 541
Nusaybin
Byzantine–Sasanian War of 540–562
Battles involving the Goths